Gulose is an aldohexose sugar.  It is a monosaccharide that is very rare in nature, but has been found in archaea, bacteria and eukaryotes. It also exists as a syrup with a sweet taste. It is soluble in water and slightly soluble in methanol. Neither the - nor -forms are fermentable by yeast.

D-Gulose is a C-3 epimer of D-galactose and a C-5 epimer of L-mannose.

References

Aldohexoses